Gargul-e Olya (also Romanized as Gargūl-e ‘Olyā; also known as Gargūl-e Bālā) is a village in Lahijan-e Sharqi Rural District, Lajan District, Piranshahr County, West Azerbaijan Province, Iran. At the 2006 census, its population was 228, in 38 families.

References 

Populated places in Piranshahr County